The Billboard Spirit of Hope is an honor that is presented by Billboard magazine to an artist or a group in recognition of their extraordinary philanthropic and humanitarian contributions beyond their musical work." The accolade was established in 1996 in honor of Selena, who died a year earlier. The recipient of the Lifetime Achievement Award is decided by the Billboard editorial committee. The Spirit of Hope Award was first given to Cuban American singer Gloria Estefan.

Since 1996, the Lifetime Achievement Award has been presented during the Billboard Latin Music Awards. The award was not presented in 2012, 2016, 2018, 2019, and 2021.

Recipients

See also
 Latin Recording Academy Person of the Year
 List of humanitarian and service awards

References

1996 establishments in the United States
Awards established in 1996
Billboard Latin Music Awards
Humanitarian and service awards
Music-related lists